The Aztec rail or Mexican rail, (Rallus tenuirostris) is a Near Threatened species of bird in subfamily Rallinae of family Rallidae, the rails, gallinules, and coots. It is endemic to Mexico.

Taxonomy and systematics

The Aztec rail was previously treated as conspecific with what are now the mangrove rail (R. longirostris), Ridgway's rail (R. obsoletus), the king rail (R. elegans), and the clapper rail (R. crepitans), and more recently as conspecific with the king rail. Worldwide taxonomic systems now agree that each of the five is a separate species based on a 2013 study that described their different genetics and morphologies. Many systems treat it as most closely related to Ridgway's rail.

The Aztec rail is monotypic.

Description

Males weigh  and females . The sexes have similar plumage. The species has dark and light morphs. The dark morph has rich brown upperparts with blackish markings on the back. It has a pale pinkish cheek stripe and a white chin and throat. Its underparts are rufous with dull brown and white to pinkish cinnamon barring on the flanks and white undertail coverts. The light morph's underparts have a pale white center with a pinkish cinnamon wash. Juveniles have duller and darker upperparts and paler underparts than adults.

Distribution and habitat

The Aztec rail is found only in central Mexico. It inhabits both seasonal and permanent highland freshwater marshes. In elevation it ranges from  up to at least .

Behavior

Movement

The Aztec rail is mostly a year-round resident throughout its range but some apparently disperse from permanent wetlands to temporary ones during the May to September rainy season.

Feeding

The Aztec rail's principal food is crustaceans, especially crayfish, but its diet also includes molluscs, terrestrial and aquatic insects, and possibly spiders, fish, and amphibians.

Breeding

The Aztec rail's core breeding season extends from May to August but might also include April and September. One well-described nest was a dome made of spikerush (Eleocharis) within a stand of spikerush. The clutch size was five eggs.

Vocalization

The Aztec rail's courtship calls are a "loud, harsh series of 'kik' or 'kuk'" notes. Both sexes make "a series of 'chac' notes" as an "advertising call". The also give a "soft, rapid 'tuk'."

Status

The IUCN has assessed the Aztec rail as Near Threatened. It has a moderate size range that might be expanding. However, its estimated population of 15,000 mature individuals is believed to be decreasing. Its freshwater marsh habitat is "under threat from increasing agricultural, industrial and urban development".

References

Endemic birds of Mexico
Rallus
Birds described in 1874
Taxa named by Robert Ridgway
Birds of the Trans-Mexican Volcanic Belt